Bull Moose may refer to:

 Bull moose, a mature male moose
 Progressive Party (United States, 1912), nicknamed the Bull Moose Party
 Bull Moose Music, an independent retailer and record store chain based in Portland, Maine
 Bull Moose Jackson (1919–1989), an American blues and rhythm-and-blues singer
 Bull Moose Township, Cass County, Minnesota, a township

See also 
 Bullmoose (disambiguation)
 Live at Bull Moose (disambiguation)